A lacrosse ball is the solid rubber ball that is used, with a lacrosse stick, to play the sport of lacrosse.  It is typically white for men's lacrosse, or yellow for women's Lacrosse; but is also produced in a wide variety of colours.

The old NCAA specifications are:
Mass 140 g – 147 g
Diameter 62.7 mm – 64.7 mm
Rebound From 1,800 height 1,092 – 1292 mm (70% rebound from falling point)
Rubber content 65%

The new NCAA specifications are:
Color: Can be white, yellow or orange 
Circumference: 7 3/4 and 8 inches
Weight: 5 and 5 1/2 ounces 
Must be solid rubber

Ball must also be dropped from a height of 72 inches upon floor and needs to bounce at least 43 to 51 inches .

According to the 2015 and 2016 Men's Lacrosse Rules and Interpretations: 
"The ball shall be white, yellow, orange or lime green smooth or slightly textured solid rubber. The ball must meet the current NOCSAE lacrosse ball standard." Later, in further defining the required specifications, the document states: "The measurements for the ball shall include the following: The ball shall be of white, yellow, or orange solid rubber. The ball may measure between 7 3/4 and 8 inches in circumference. The ball may weigh between 5 and 5 1/4 ounces in weight."

Beginning with the 2014 season, all three governing bodies for lacrosse in the United States (US Lacrosse, NFHS, NCAA) have mandated that only balls meeting the NOCSAE ball standard may be used for competition. Balls must be emblazoned with the words "Meets NOCSAE Standard" in order to be deemed legal for play by game officials.

Starting by June 2016, all lacrosse balls have had to meet the new NOCSAE Standard. for use in official NCAA and NFHS play. Canadian official games require CLA approvals.

History
Originally known as "stickball", the earliest lacrosse balls were made from wood and later from buckskins filled with fur. These were made naturally and was meant to keep the game connected with nature. This was until Dr. William George Beers in 1860 codified the rules including having the ball made with rubber.

Manufacturers
Signature Lacrosse was removed from the SEI certified list in 2020 and 2021 for falsifying safety specifications to the NOCSAE organization and were selling unsafe lacrosse balls.  

Wolf Athletics is the official ball supplier of the Premier Lacrosse League.
≈

On January 14, 2022 at the US Lacrosse Convention, REPS Lacrosse revealed the first "Smart" Lacrosse Ball dubbed the "R1 by REPS". The ball comes equipped with a patented embedded suite of sensors which tie into the REPS Lacrosse App. This marked the first major development in lacrosse ball technology since the PEARL-X lacrosse ball introduced a "non-grease" ball.

References

Lacrosse
Ball

https://www.nfhs.org/media/3812049/2020-sei-user-notice-sl-17.pdf